Malta participated at the Eurovision Song Contest 1994 in Dublin, Ireland. Their entry was "More than Love" performed by Chris and Moira.

Before Eurovision

National final 
The final was held on 5 February 1994 at the Mediterranean Conference Centre in Valletta, hosted by Lucienne Selvagi and John Bundy.

At Eurovision
Chris and Moira performed 12th on the night of the contest, following Romania and preceding Netherlands. At the close of the voting the song had received 97 points (including maximum 12 points from Bosnia and Herzegovina), placing 5th of 25. The Maltese jury awarded its 12 points to Slovakia.

Voting

References

External links
Maltese National Final 1994

1994
Countries in the Eurovision Song Contest 1994
Eurovision